A rage comic is a short cartoon strip using a growing set of pre-made cartoon faces, or rage faces, which usually express rage or some other simple emotion or activity. They are usually crudely drawn in Microsoft Paint or other simple drawing programs, and were most popular in the early 2010s. These webcomics have spread much in the same way that internet memes do, and several memes have originated in this medium. They have been characterized by Ars Technica as an "accepted and standardized form of online communication." The popularity of rage comics has been attributed to their use as vehicles for humorizing shared experiences. The range of expression and standardized, easily identifiable faces has allowed uses such as teaching English as a foreign language.

In the early 2020s, rage comics were revived as 'trollge incidents'. Trollge incidents are a series of memes revolving around Carlos Ramirez's Trollface character from Rage Comics but with a much darker and introspective tone. These memes usually take the form of "Trollge incidents", which are stories narrated in steps and taking a darker tone as the story goes on. There are many popular trollge incidents, such as the "Betrayal incident" and "Nature's corruption incident".

History 
Although used on numerous websites such as Reddit, Cheezburger, ESS.MX, Ragestache, and 9GAG, the source of the rage comic has largely been attributed to 4chan in mid-2008. The first rage comic was posted to the 4chan /b/ "Random" board in 2008. It was a simple 4-panel strip showing the author's anger about getting Poseidon's kiss while on the toilet, with the final panel featuring a zoomed-in face, known as Rage Guy, saying "FFFFFFFUUUUUUUUUUUU-". It was quickly reposted and modified, with other users creating new scenarios and characters.

Google Trends data shows that the term "rage guy" peaked in April 2009 while the terms "rage comics" and "troll face" both peaked in March 2009.

Trollface 

One of the most widely used rage comic faces is the Trollface, drawn by Oakland artist Carlos Ramirez in 2008. Originally posted in a comic to his DeviantArt account Whynne about Internet trolling on 4chan, the trollface is a recognizable image of Internet memes and culture. Ramirez has used his creation, registered with the United States Copyright Office in 2009, to gain over $100,000 in licensing fees, settlements, and other payouts. The video game Meme Run for Nintendo's Wii U console was taken down for having the trollface as the main character.

See also 
 List of Internet memes
 Wojak – a similar meme which also uses derivative copies of a black-and-white MS paint face illustrations.

References

External links 

Webcomic formats
2007 webcomic debuts
Internet memes introduced in 2007
2007 drawings
4chan phenomena
Internet memes
2000s in Internet culture
2010s in Internet culture
2000s fads and trends
2010s fads and trends